Nazareth cheese, named after Nazareth, the village where it originated, is a Belgian hard cheese. 

It is now manufactured by Belgomilk, which is part of the Milcobel group.   The cheese, which can be identified by its dark brown rind, has a mildly subtle flavour. Quick restaurants have rapidly made a collaboration to serve some "kaas croketten" available in 5 or 13 pièces in every Quick in Belgium. Leker.

See also
 List of cheeses

References

Belgian cheeses
Cow's-milk cheeses
Nazareth, Belgium